FootageBank is a stock footage company based in Los Angeles, California founded by Paula Lumbard. FootageBank is dedicated to shooting and aggregating collections of video clips to serve the demand for high definition and large format content in the film and television marketplace.

The FootageBank library represents more than 120 video producers, such as Randall Dark, cinematographers, and production companies from around the globe offering a large and comprehensive library.

History
FootageBank opened in the spring of 2002 by footage industry veterans Paula Lumbard and Carol Martin. Lumbard and Martin earned their footage chops at Film Bank and Corbis Motion.

References

Video production companies
Companies based in Los Angeles